Laura Collett  (born 31 August 1989) is a British equestrian who competes in eventing.

Early life and career
Collett won the supreme pony title at Horse of the Year Show in 2003 when she was 13. She won nine medals during her youth career, including three individual golds, in the juniors in 2006 on Fernhill Sox, in the juniors in 2007 on Rayef, and the young riders in 2009 again on Rayef.

Career
Laura has been selected for three European Eventing Championships as an individual. She was eliminated on the cross-country on her senior championship debut at Luhmühlen in 2011, but finished 13th at the 2015 championships at Blair Castle on Grand Manoeuvre. Collett was second at Luhmühlen five-star in 2018 on Mr Bass, but she achieved her first five-star win in October 2020 when she took the title at the Pau Horse Trials, France, riding her own, Keith Scott and Karen Bartlett's horse London 52 and therefore has the honour of winning the only five-star of 2020 because the eventing calendar that year had been decimated by Covid-19.
The horse had previously been the 2018 eight- and nine-year-old champion at Blenheim Horse Trials, as well as winning the Event Rider Masters at Chatsworth Horse Trials
and the CCI4*-L at the Boekelo Horse Trials, both in 2019. But he had also fallen at the 2019 European Eventing Championships in Luhmühlen having sat third after the dressage.

In 2021, eight years after her near fatal accident, Laura and London 52 were selected to represent Britain at the 2020 Summer Olympics in Tokyo that been delayed by the Covid-19 pandemic . She won gold in the team event with Oliver Townend and Tom McEwen.

Collett was appointed Member of the Order of the British Empire (MBE) in the 2022 New Year Honours for services to equestrianism.

In 2022, Collett won the Badminton  Horse Trials. Riding London 52, she led from start to finish, setting an all time Badminton record finishing score of 21.4.

Personal life
Following a heavy fall from her horse in 2013, Collett had to be resuscitated five times and given an emergency tracheotomy by paramedics after suffering a fractured shoulder, broken ribs, a punctured lung, a lacerated liver and damage to her kidneys. Also, a fragment of her shoulder bone had detached and travelled to her right eye through her blood stream and damaged the optic nerve. She was placed in an induced coma for six days.

International Championship results

CCI5* results

Notable horses

Fernhill Sox
2006 European Junior Championships - team silver, individual gold
Rayef
2007 European Junior Championships - team & individual gold
2009 European Young Rider Championships - team & individual gold
Fernhill Cristal
2010 European Young Rider Championships - team gold, individual 8th
Mr Bass
2015 World Young Horse champion
2018 Luhmühlen 5* runner up
London 52
2018 Blenheim 4* 8&9 year old winner
2020 Pau 5* winner
2021 Olympic Games - team gold, individual 9th
2022 Badminton 5* winner
Badminton 5* finishing score record holder (21.4)

References

1989 births
Living people
British female equestrians
British event riders
Equestrians at the 2020 Summer Olympics
Medalists at the 2020 Summer Olympics
Olympic medalists in equestrian
Olympic gold medallists for Great Britain
Olympic equestrians of Great Britain
Members of the Order of the British Empire